Monghpyak (also Mong Hpyak, Mongphyat, Maingbyat, Meng-pen-ma; Mong is equivalent to Mueang) is a town in  Kengtung District (formerly part of Mong Hpayak District) of Eastern Shan State of Myanmar. It is the principal town of and administrative center for  Mong Hpayak Township.  The town is located on the Tachilek–Kengtung paved road. , a paved road was under construction from Mong Hpayak east to Mong Yawng.

Notes

External links
"Mong Hpayak Map — Satellite Images of Mong Hpayak" Maplandia World Gazetteer

Township capitals of Myanmar
Populated places in Shan State